Thomas Lewis (by 1533 – 2 November 1594), of The Van, Glamorganshire, was a Welsh politician.

He was a Member (MP) of the Parliament of England for Monmouth Boroughs in 1555.

References

1594 deaths
16th-century Welsh politicians
People from Glamorgan
English MPs 1555
Year of birth uncertain